Soheil Rahmani is an Iranian footballer who plays for Baadraan in the Azadegan League.

Club career
Rahmani played his entire career in Malavan. In July 2012 Malavan put him in transfer list. He participate in Malavan's rival, Damash pre-season trainings. After passing the technical tests, Malavan didn't let him to join Damash. So he remain in Bandar-e Anzali for his contract's last year.

Statistics

References

External links
 Soheil Rahmani at PersianLeague.com

Living people
Malavan players
Iranian footballers
1988 births
Association football defenders
Association football midfielders